opened in 1990 in Urasoe, Okinawa Prefecture, Japan. The collection has a particular focus upon Ryukyu lacquerware.

See also

 Okinawa Prefectural Museum

References

External links
  Urasoe Art Museum

Museums in Okinawa Prefecture
Art museums and galleries in Japan
Museums established in 1990
1990 establishments in Japan